Derrick Tenai (born 3 June 1968) is an archer from the Solomon Islands.

Tenai represented the Solomon Islands at the 1988 Summer Olympics held in Seoul, competing in the men's individual archery, where he finished last. He had arrived at the Olympics never having seen a modern bow before, he didn't hit the bullseye once and completely missed the target 55 times.

References

External links
 

Living people
Solomon Islands male archers
Olympic archers of the Solomon Islands
Archers at the 1988 Summer Olympics
1968 births